Watts S. Humphrey (July 4, 1927 – October 28, 2010) was an American pioneer in software engineering who was called the "father of software quality."

Biography 
Watts Humphrey (whose grandfather and father also had the same name) was born in Battle Creek, Michigan on July 4, 1927.
His uncle was US Secretary of the Treasury George M. Humphrey.
In 1944, he graduated from high school and served in the United States Navy.
Despite dyslexia, he received a bachelor of science in physics from the University of Chicago, a master of science in physics from Illinois Institute of Technology physics department, and a master of business administration from the University of Chicago Graduate School of Business.

In 1953 he went to Boston and worked at Sylvania Labs.
In 1959 he joined IBM.
In the late 1960s, Humphrey headed the IBM software team that introduced the first software license.  Humphrey was a vice president at IBM. 

In the 1980s at the Software Engineering Institute (SEI) at Carnegie Mellon University Humphrey founded the Software Process Program, and served as director of that program from 1986 until the early 1990s. This program was aimed at understanding and managing the software engineering process because this is where big and small organizations or individuals encounter the most serious difficulties and where, thereafter, lies the best opportunity for significant improvement.

The program resulted in the development of the Capability Maturity Model, published in 1989 in Humphrey's "Managing the Software Process" and inspired the later development of the personal software process (PSP) and the team software process (TSP) concepts.

Humphrey received an honorary doctor of software engineering from the Embry-Riddle Aeronautical University in 1998.
The Watts Humphrey Software Quality Institute in Chennai, India was named after him in 2000.
In 2003, Humphrey was awarded the National Medal of Technology. 
Humphrey became a fellow of the SEI and of the Association for Computing Machinery in 2008.

See also 
 Personal software process (PSP)
 Software quality
 Team software process (TSP)

Publications 
Humphrey is the author of several books, including 
 2011. Leadership, Teamwork, and Trust: Building a Competitive Software Capability. Addison-Wesley, Reading, MA.
 2010. Reflections on Management: How to Manage Your Software Projects, Your Teams, Your Boss, and Yourself. Addison-Wesley, Reading, MA.
 2006. TSP, Coaching Development Teams. Addison-Wesley, Reading, MA.
 2006. TSP, Leading a Development Team. Addison-Wesley, Reading, MA.
 2005. PSP, A Self-Improvement Process for Software Engineers. Addison-Wesley, Reading, MA.
 2001. Winning with Software: An Executive Strategy. Addison-Wesley, Reading, MA.
 1999. Introduction to the Team Software Process. Addison-Wesley, Reading, MA.
 1997. Introduction to the Personal Software Process. Addison-Wesley, Reading, MA.
 1996. Managing Technical People - Innovation, Teamwork and Software Process. Addison-Wesley, Reading, MA.
 1995. A Discipline for Software Engineering. Addison-Wesley, Reading, MA.
 1989. Managing the Software Process. Addison-Wesley, Reading, MA.
 1958. Switching Circuits with Computer Applications. McGraw-Hill Book Company

References

External links 
 Pittsburgh Post-Gazette obituary
 The Watts New? Collection: Columns by the SEI's Watts Humphrey

1927 births
Carnegie Mellon University faculty
IBM employees
2010 deaths
People in information technology
Quality experts
American software engineers
University of Chicago Booth School of Business alumni
Fellows of the Association for Computing Machinery
Illinois Institute of Technology alumni
National Medal of Technology recipients
Writers from Illinois